Dhekra Gomri is a Tunisian footballer who plays as a right back for AS Banque de l'Habitat and the Tunisia women's national team.

Club career
Gomri has played for UST and AS Banque de l'Habitat in Tunisia.

International career
Gomri capped for Tunisia at senior level during two Africa Women Cup of Nations qualifications (2012 and 2014).

International goals
Scores and results list Tunisia's goal tally first

See also
List of Tunisia women's international footballers

References

External links

Living people
Tunisian women's footballers
Women's association football fullbacks
Tunisia women's international footballers
Tunisian emigrants to the United Arab Emirates
Naturalized citizens of the United Arab Emirates
Emirati women's footballers
United Arab Emirates women's international footballers
Dual internationalists (women's football)
Emirati people of Tunisian descent
Year of birth missing (living people)